CCID may refer to:

 CCID (protocol), USB protocol
 CCID Consulting, company based in Beijing
 Charging circuit interrupting device
 Credit Card ID, a synonym for Card Security Code
 Coordinating Center for Infectious Diseases, part of the Centers for Disease Control and Prevention
 Central City Improvement District, a Cape Town-based urban management organisation